John Verdun Newton (12 April 1916 – 14 January 1944) was an Australian politician and Royal Australian Air Force (RAAF) officer. While serving with the RAAF in Europe during the Second World War, Newton was elected to the Parliament of Western Australia for the seat of Greenough at the 1943 state election, but was killed in action 55 days later.

While many other members of Australian parliaments (MPs) have simultaneously served in wars, Newton's tenure was unusual because he was: both preselected and elected while he was overseas; one of only a few serving members of Australian parliaments to fly on combat operations; neither sworn in, nor able to sit in parliament, and; killed in action while he was an MP.

Civilian life and political career
Jack Newton was the son of Mary Elizabeth Newton (née Doyle), and Edward Henry Newton, who had moved from Victoria to become farmers at Mingenew.

As the Second World War broke out, Newton and his three brothers were working as sharefarmers, growing wheat. He was a member of the Wheat and Woolgrowers' Union (an association of small-scale farmers aligned to the political left). Jack Newton had reportedly also worked as a shearer and was a former member of the Australian Workers' Union.

When a State election was announced for 20 November 1943, Newton was pre-selected as the Labor Party (ALP) candidate for the seat of Greenough in the Legislative Assembly (lower house). He reportedly made his formal nomination by cable from London. Newton was elected with 52.81% (1,944 of 3,733 votes cast) of the first preferences, defeating the incumbent, William Patrick of the Country Party. Greenough became one of two seats in the lower house gained by the ALP as it retained government.

Towards the end of 1943, Newton took part in a BBC Radio Overseas Service program Calling Australian Towns, giving a speech that he styled as an address to his constituents in Greenough (see excerpt, left).

Newton was officially listed as "missing in action" following a mission on the evening of 14 January 1944.

On 27 September 1945, the seat of Greenough was officially declared vacant. A by-election was held on 27 October 1945. The Labor candidate was Jack Newton's brother, Cecil Newton, who was defeated by the Liberal nominee, David Brand. (A veteran of the North African and Greek campaigns with the Australian Army, Brand later became Premier and retained Greenough until his retirement from politics in 1975.)

It was not unusual at the time for legislators to enter military service. In some Commonwealth parliaments that followed the Westminster system, there was a convention that if a Member of Parliament (MP) enlisted during wartime, they would be assigned a "pair": the party opposite would voluntarily withdraw one member from voting in parliament. And some other legislators had, like Newton, been elected while on active service.

Few serving members of Australian parliaments have flown on combat operations as military aviators. There may be only one other example: Thomas White was an RAAF staff officer in Europe during the Second World War, while continuing to represent a federal electorate in Victoria. According to the Australian Parliamentary Library, White "surreptitiously flew on several sorties as a second-pilot".

Many other members of the Western Australian Parliament have died in office and one other MP has been killed in action: Bart Stubbs (ALP; Subiaco) died during the First World War, while serving with the Australian Imperial Force in Belgium. However, Jack Newton's case is unusual because he was killed in action before he could take part in a parliamentary sitting.

War service 1941–44
In 1941, Newton was called up and enlisted in the Citizen Air Force (as the RAAF reserve was known at the time) on 17 August 1941, with the service number 415270. After training as a pilot at No. 9 Elementary Flying Training School (at RAAF Cunderdin) and No. 4 Service Flying Training School (RAAF Geraldton), Newton was awarded pilot's "wings" on 15 May 1942.

At the time, the Australian Defence Act prevented the posting of reservists and conscripts to units outside the South West Pacific theatre. Newton, however, volunteered for frontline service in British Royal Air Force (RAF) formations, under the Empire Air Training Scheme and was re-enlisted in the Permanent Air Force.

He was posted to the United Kingdom for operational training with RAF Bomber Command. For several months, Newton trained for night bombing with four-engined heavy bombers at No. 11 OTU (RAF Oakley, Buckinghamshire).

In late October 1943, Newton was promoted to Flight Lieutenant and posted to No. 90 Squadron RAF, at RAF Tuddenham in Suffolk. He captained Short Stirlings during raids on Germany, including raids on Kassel, Frankfurt and Bremen. His commanding officer at 90 Sqn, Wing Commander J. H. Giles, described Newton as: "An above average Officer who is an excellent leader of men."

In a newspaper interview published in November 1943, Newton mentioned that all of the other members of his original crew had been killed, while flying with another pilot. (This appears to have occurred while Newton was hospitalised due to illness.) He added that he expected to complete a tour of duty (which at the time comprised 30 sorties) "by Christmas", suggesting that he was flying, on average, three or four operations per week.

During November, Newton was transferred to No. 7 Squadron RAF, an Avro Lancaster Pathfinder unit, at RAF Oakington in Cambridgeshire, where he served until his death.

Killed in action, 1944
On 14 January 1944, Newton was the captain of Lancaster B.III, JA905 (squadron code "MG-V"), which was recorded as taking off from Oakington at 16:53. The crew to mark targets for the main bomber force, around Braunschweig (Brunswick), in Lower Saxony. The other crew members were RAF personnel: Flt Lt H. O. Wharmby (second pilot); Sgt W. H. Holmes (flight engineer); F/O A. R. Broadbent (navigator); Flt Sgt D. V. Bunting (bomb aimer); Sgt S. W. Bury (wireless operator/front gunner); P/O F. W. Harding (mid-upper gunner) and; F/O J. N. (Nigel) Richards (rear gunner). (Nigel Richards had partly inspired the main character in Cyril Connolly's pre-war novel The Rock Pool.)

The raid was to be Allied bombers' first major attack on Braunschweig; the operation called for 498 aircraft from Bomber Command to attack targets that included two Messerschmitt aircraft factories. As a relatively direct route was chosen, the pathfinders were detected by German radar at an early stage of the evening. Under a new tactical system known as Zahme Sau ("Tame Sow"), night fighters were directed at the bombers by Luftgau-Kommando XI (LgK XI; "Air District Command 11") in Hanover.

The operation failed, to the point that it was, according to historian Martin Middlebrook, "a minor disaster". A total of 38 Lancasters were lost, including 11 pathfinders – a fact that prevented accurate targeting, and as a result, no damage was done to any of the primary targets.

JA905 was one of the aircraft that did not return and its entire crew was reported missing. Post-war investigations by the RAF established that JA905 and another Lancaster B.III from 7 Squadron (JA935; "MG-O"), had crashed relatively close to each other, north-west of Braunschweig. The wreckage of both bombers had been subjected to massive explosions and/or intense fires, which prevented positive identification of either the aircraft or the remains of their crews.

Later research, by Stefan Ilsemann, has suggested that JA905 was attacked over Schwarmstedt by more than one fighter, which most likely belonged to a locally-based nightfighter unit, NJG 3 – although NJG 2 also claimed four-engined bombers in the same area that evening. The bomber was reportedly damaged several times by the fighters and caught fire; it then "lost height and completed a 180 degree turn", before the pilot/s apparently attempted a crash landing in a field. JA905 – evidently still carrying a full bomb load – descended too rapidly, to make a controlled landing. At about 19:00 the bomber exploded violently as it hit the ground – in a field just inside the town limits of Warmeloh, but nearer to the village of Hope, about four miles (6.5 km) south of Schwarmstedt. According to Ilsemann: "Most of the roofs and windows in the village of Hope were damaged by the blast".

The crew was of JA905 was  initially buried, along with the wreckage, in the crater caused by the explosion. Following the end of the war, the Commonwealth War Graves Commission exhumed and reinterred their remains at its Hannover War Cemetery.

Footnotes
Notes

Citations

External links
 Aviation Research Neustadt, n.d. F/L John Verdun Newton. (Image of headstone at Hannover War Cemetery.) (2 November 2014)
 Parliament of Western Australia, 2015, Biographical Register of Members of the Parliament of Western Australia John Verdun Newton (21 December 2015)

1916 births
1940s missing person cases
1944 deaths
20th-century Australian politicians
Australian Labor Party members of the Parliament of Western Australia
Australian military personnel killed in World War II
Australian World War II pilots
Burials at Hanover War Cemetery
Members of the Western Australian Legislative Assembly
Military personnel from Western Australia
Missing in action of World War II
Missing person cases in Germany
People from Dongara, Western Australia
People from Mingenew, Western Australia
Royal Australian Air Force officers
Royal Australian Air Force personnel of World War II